·
February 15 - Eastern Orthodox liturgical calendar - February 17

All fixed commemorations below are observed on March 1  (February 29 on leap years) by Eastern Orthodox Churches on the Old Calendar.

For February 16th, Orthodox Churches on the Old Calendar commemorate the Saints listed on February 3.

Saints

 Hieromartyrs Pamphilus of Caesarea, Priest, and 11 companions, at Caesarea in Palaestina (c. 307-309):
 Valens, Deacon, and Martyrs Paul, Seleucus, Porphyrius, Julian, Theodulus, Elias, Jeremiah, Isaiah, Samuel, and Daniel.
 Saint Maruthas of Martyropolis, Bishop of Sophene and Martyropolis (422), and the Martyrs of Persia (4th century), whose relics rest in Martyropolis.
 Saint Flavian I of Antioch, Archbishop of Antioch (404)  (see also: September 27)
 Saint Flavian the Confessor, Archbishop of Constantinople (449)
 Venerable Flavian the Hermit, monastic and Wonderworker.
 Saint Mary the New, of Byzia in Thrace (9th century)

Pre-Schism Western saints

 Saint Onesimus, of the Seventy Apostles (c. 68) (see also: February 15)
 Saint Honestus (Honestus of Nîmes), a disciple of Saturninus of Toulouse, who preached the Gospel in Spain (270)
 Saint Faustinus of Brescia, Bishop of Brescia and Confessor (381) 
 Hieromartyr Tanco of Verden, Bishop of Verden (815)

Post-Schism Orthodox saints

 New Monk-martyr Romanus of Karpenision and Kapsokalyvia, Mount Athos, at Constantinople (1694) (see also January 5)
 Saint Basil Gryaznov of Pavlovo-Posadsky (1869)
 Saint Macarius (Nevsky), Metropolitan of Moscow, Apostle to the Altai (1926)
 Saint Nicholas of Japan, Archbishop and Equal-to-the-Apostles (1912) (New Calendar date see also: February 3)

New martyrs and confessors

 New Hieromartyr Peter Lagov, Priest (1931)
 New Hieromartyr Elias Chetverukhin, Priest, of Moscow (1934)
 New Hieromartyr Paul, Priest (1938)

Other commemorations

 Translation of the relics of Virgin-martyr Juliana of Nicomedia (304) (see also December 21)
 Synaxis of the 'Cypriot' Icon of the Theotokos.

Icon gallery

Notes

References

Sources
 February 16 / March 1. Orthodox Calendar (Pravoslavie.ru).
 March 1 / February 16. Holy Trinity Russian Orthodox Church (A parish of the Patriarchate of Moscow).
 February 16. OCA - The Lives of the Saints.
 The Autonomous Orthodox Metropolia of Western Europe and the Americas. St. Hilarion Calendar of Saints for the year of our Lord 2004. St. Hilarion Press (Austin, TX). p. 15.
 The Sixteenth Day Day of the Month of February. Orthodoxy in China.
 February 16. Latin Saints of the Orthodox Patriarchate of Rome.
 The Roman Martyrology. Transl. by the Archbishop of Baltimore. Last Edition, According to the Copy Printed at Rome in 1914. Revised Edition, with the Imprimatur of His Eminence Cardinal Gibbons. Baltimore: John Murphy Company, 1916. pp. 49–50.
 Rev. Richard Stanton. A Menology of England and Wales, or, Brief Memorials of the Ancient British and English Saints Arranged According to the Calendar, Together with the Martyrs of the 16th and 17th Centuries. London: Burns & Oates, 1892. p. 72.
Greek Sources
 Great Synaxaristes:  16 Φεβρουαρίου. Μεγασ Συναξαριστησ.
  Συναξαριστής. 16 Φεβρουαρίου. Ecclesia.gr. (H Εκκλησια Τησ Ελλαδοσ). 
Russian Sources
  1 марта (16 февраля). Православная Энциклопедия под редакцией Патриарха Московского и всея Руси Кирилла (электронная версия). (Orthodox Encyclopedia - Pravenc.ru).

February in the Eastern Orthodox calendar